MV Fenella is a bulk cargo ship owned by Mineralien Schiffahrt Spedition & Transport
Schnaittenbach, Germany.

Construction
The vessel was constructed at Ihi Marine United Tokyo
Tokyo, Japan in 1986, and was originally named Virginia Rainbow.

References

1986 ships